"Big Time" is a song co-written and recorded by American country music duo Big & Rich.  It was released in February 2005 as the fourth and final single from their album Horse of a Different Color.  The song was written by Big Kenny, John Rich and Angie Aparo.

Content
The characters in the song are presumably a band performing a gig at a bar, singing toward a wealthier patron. They thank him for his generosity in providing various items that can be used by others, such as boats and planes. They ask, however, that he be generous when tipping for their performance. Whether or not they receive any money from him, however, they are in the "big time," relative to some in their current status.

Music video
The video is set in and around Deadwood, South Dakota. At the start of the song, Kenny Alphin and John Rich are shown riding horses. They then are shown singing and playing guitar while sitting at the Moonshine Gulch Saloon in Rochford, South Dakota. A man in a cowboy hat walks in and they ask him for tip money; he refuses and walks on. They then perform a concert outside. It premiered in the week of April 25, 2005.

Personnel
From Horse of a Different Color liner notes.

 Big Kenny - vocals
 Mike Johnson - steel guitar
 Wayne Killius - drums
 John Rich - vocals, acoustic guitar
 Michael Rojas - keyboards
 Adam Shoenfeld - electric guitar
 Jonathan Yudkin - fiddle

Chart positions
"Big Time" debuted at number 52 on the U.S. Billboard Hot Country Singles & Tracks for the week of February 19, 2005.

References

2005 singles
Big & Rich songs
Songs written by Big Kenny
Songs written by John Rich
Songs written by Angie Aparo
Song recordings produced by Paul Worley
Song recordings produced by John Rich
Music videos directed by Deaton-Flanigen Productions
Warner Records singles
2004 songs